Corinth, Virginia may refer to the following places in Virginia:
Corinth, Carroll County, Virginia
Corinth, Southampton County, Virginia